The Person and the Common Good is a 1947 book about social philosophy by the French philosopher Jacques Maritain.

Summary

Following the philosopher and theologian Thomas Aquinas, Maritain discusses "the distinction between individuality and personality."

Reception
According to the philosopher John Haldane, The Person and the Common Good is Maritain's major contribution to social philosophy.

References

Footnotes

Bibliography
Books

 
 

1947 non-fiction books
Books by Jacques Maritain
French non-fiction books